Commerce Street Industrial Historic District is a national historic district located at Petersburg, Virginia. The district includes 12 contributing buildings and 1 contributing structure located in a predominantly industrial section of Petersburg. It is dominated by four early-20th century industrial complexes – Petersburg Trunk and Bag Company (c. 1915), Titmus Optical Company (c. 1919), Rogers and Madison Trunk Corporation (c. 1921), and Southern Chemical Company (c. 1925).

It was listed on the National Register of Historic Places in 2008.

References

Industrial buildings and structures on the National Register of Historic Places in Virginia
Historic districts on the National Register of Historic Places in Virginia
Colonial Revival architecture in Virginia
Buildings and structures in Petersburg, Virginia
National Register of Historic Places in Petersburg, Virginia